New Ways But Love Stays is the second studio album by the Jean Terrell-led Supremes. Building on the foundation of the group's first LP, Right On, New Ways was produced by Frank Wilson and features The Supremes' most successful single with Terrell, "Stoned Love".

Background 

The plea for peace and love was written by Wilson and a Detroit teenager named Kenny Thomas. The song's title, read by many entertainment executives as a double-edged drug reference, prevented the song from making an impact in some areas; for example, footage of The Supremes performing the number was edited out of a November 1970 episode of The Merv Griffin Show. However, the song still was a huge success on the charts, reaching number 7 on the Billboard hot 100, number 1 on the Billboard R&B singles chart and number 3 in the UK.

New Ways But Love Stays was originally titled Stoned Love after its hit single; the controversy over the song's name prevented this from occurring. Another change that befell the project was the alteration of the original album cover. The original design used a photograph which depicted the three Supremes in Afros and dark green turtlenecks, giving them a Black Power look. Apparently feeling that such a look would go against the Supremes' established "glamour girl" image, Motown's final front cover for New Ways But Love Stays includes one of the Black power photos, but it is inset within a circle and surrounded by additional inset pictures of the three Supremes in their more familiar gowns. The individual photos of the three Supremes had already appeared in the artwork for the album The Magnificent Seven. The reverse of the album cover is a full portrait of the trio in the 'black power' styling. This was a colour photograph on the US release, but black and white when released on Tamla Motown in the UK and Europe.

Besides its hit single, the album also includes several notable album tracks, such as "Together We Can Make Such Sweet Music" (a Spinners cover), and "It's Time to Break Down", which is today recognized as a minor "dusty groove" classic, and was sampled by hip hop producer DJ Premier for the Gang Starr song "JFK 2 LAX", included on the 1998 LP Moment of Truth. Terrell was quoted in October 1970 describing both "Stoned Love" and "It's Time to Break Down" as having the "Motown beat".

Critical reception

The Rolling Stone Album Guide praised the "magnificent" "Stoned Love", before lamenting the group's slide into "mere professionalism." A Cashbox reviewer wrote: 'An apt title indeed for this new Supremes outing showcasing some of Motown's newer writers. And there's been a subtle change in the group along much the same lines as the Temps. Songs are longer with a shift in emphasis to arranging of the instrumental parts of the songs. No longer is the band just a backing group but, again as with the Temps, has become a totally integrated entity along with the girls so that the Supremes now are not simply a trio but a twenty piece group. This then is Motown's key to chart success, never stand still. "Stoned Love," "It's Time To Break Down," and "Together We Can Make Such Sweet Music" are perfect examples. Paul and Artie's "Bridge" is given the best treatment since the original. Super LP!' Robert Hilburn wrote in his syndicated record review column that 'Without Miss Ross, the Supremes still have a pleasant sound, but not really an impressive or commanding one.'

Covers 
On New Ways But Love Stays The Supremes covered Simon & Garfunkel's "Bridge Over Troubled Water", The Beatles' "Come Together, Steam's "Na Na Hey Hey (Kiss Him Goodbye)", the Four Tops' I Wish I Were Your Mirror, Martha and the Vandellas' Is There a Place (In His Heart for Me) and The Spinners' "Together We Can Make Such Sweet Music".

Track listing 
Side one
 "Together We Can Make Such Sweet Music" (Martin Coleman, Richard Drapkin)
 "Stoned Love" (Yennik Samoht, Frank Wilson)
 "It's Time to Break Down" (Ellean Hendley, Wilson)
 "Bridge Over Troubled Water" (Paul Simon)
 "I Wish I Were Your Mirror" (Pam Sawyer, Frank Wilson)

Side two
 "Come Together" (John Lennon, Paul McCartney)
 "Is There a Place (In His Heart for Me)" (Clay McMurray, Martin Coleman)
 "Na Na Hey Hey (Kiss Him Goodbye)" (Gary DeCarlo, Dale Frashuer, Paul Leka)
 "Shine on Me" (Frank Wilson)
 "Thank Him for Today" (Vincent DiMirco)

Bonus tracks
 "Love the One You're With" (Stephen Stills) (CD bonus track, position # 7, it does not appear on the original LP)

Personnel 
 Jean Terrell – lead vocals and background vocals
 Mary Wilson – lead and background vocals
 Cindy Birdsong – lead and background vocals
 The Andantes - additional background vocals

Production
 Frank Wilson – producer except "Is There A Place"
 Clay McMurray – producer on "Is There A Place"

Charts

References

1970 albums
The Supremes albums
Albums produced by Frank Wilson (musician)
Motown albums